Galusha has been used as both a given name and surname. Notable people with the name include:

Given name
 Galusha Anderson (1832–1918), American theologian
 Galusha A. Grow (1822–1907), American politician, lawyer, writer and businessman
 Galusha Pennypacker (1844–1916), Union general during the American Civil War

Surname
 Elon Galusha (1790–1856), American lawyer and Baptist preacher
 Gene Galusha (1941–2008), Jewish-American actor and narrator 
 Jonas Galusha (1753–1834), American politician, Governor of Vermont
 Kerry Galusha (born 1977), Canadian curler

See also
 Galusha House, a Federal-style house in Jericho, Vermont